2014 winter storm may refer to:

 2014 Gulf Coast winter storm
 2014 North American cold wave (disambiguation)